Dudbridge railway station served the Stroud suburb of Dudbridge and the village of Selsley, little more than  from Stroud, in Gloucestershire, England.

The station opened as "Dudbridge for Stroud" with the railway in 1867. The buildings included a two-storey station-master's house and though there was originally only a single platform, the station was a passing place on the single-track branch line.

In 1885, the Midland Railway built a very short branch line from Dudbridge to Stroud. The new line opened for goods traffic in 1885 and for passengers the following year, at which point Dudbridge became a junction station, and a second platform was built.

The Stonehouse and Nailsworth Railway, along with the rest of the Midland Railway, became part of the London Midland and Scottish Railway at the 1923 Grouping. Passenger services were suspended on the line as an economy measure to save fuel in June 1947, and were officially withdrawn from 8 June 1949. Dudbridge remained open for goods traffic until 1966.

The station buildings survived and were occupied until the early 1990s, when they were demolished. Most of the former station site has now been consumed by the redevelopment of the A419 road for the Ebley bypass, with the Dudbridge to  section used as route for the roadway.

Services

References

External links
 Stonehouse (Bristol Road) Station - Stonehouse History Group

Stroud District
Disused railway stations in Gloucestershire
Former Midland Railway stations
Railway stations in Great Britain opened in 1867
Railway stations in Great Britain closed in 1947